The 1993 Chicago White Sox season was the White Sox' 94th season. They finished with a record of 94-68, good enough for first place in the American League West, which they won on September 17, eight games ahead of the second-place Texas Rangers. However, they lost the American League Championship Series in six games to the eventual World Series champion Toronto Blue Jays. It would be the last year the Sox would compete in the American League West, as they would join the newly formed American League Central in 1994.

Offseason 
 December 8, 1992: Dave Stieb was signed as a free agent with the Chicago White Sox.
 January 4, 1993: Ellis Burks was signed as a free agent.

Regular season

1993 Opening Day lineup 
 Tim Raines, LF
 Joey Cora, 2B
 Frank Thomas, 1B
 George Bell, DH
 Robin Ventura, 3B
 Ellis Burks, RF
 Lance Johnson, CF
 Ron Karkovice, C
 Ozzie Guillén, SS
 Jack McDowell, P

Season standings

Record vs. opponents

Transactions 
 April 23, 1993: Mike LaValliere was signed as a free agent with the Chicago White Sox.
 May 23, 1993: Dave Stieb was released by the Chicago White Sox.
 June 28, 1993: Carlton Fisk was released by the Chicago White Sox.
 July 31, 1993: Tim Belcher was traded by the Cincinnati Reds to the Chicago White Sox for Johnny Ruffin and Jeff Pierce.
 August 10, 1993: Bobby Thigpen was traded by the Chicago White Sox to the Philadelphia Phillies for José DeLeón.
 September 1, 1993: Donn Pall was traded by the Chicago White Sox to the Philadelphia Phillies for Doug Lindsey.

Roster

Game log

|-
|-style="background:#bfb;"
| 1 || April 6 || @ Twins || || 10–5 || McDowell (1–0) || Tapani (0–1) || Leach (1) || 1–0 || W1
|-style="background:#fbb;"
| 2 || April 7 || @ Twins || || 1–6 || Deshaies (1–0) || McCaskill (0–1) || Aguilera (1) || 1–1 || L1
|-style="background:#bfb;"
| 3 || April 8 || @ Twins || || 9–4 || Fernandez (1–0) || Mahomes (0–1) || – || 2–1 || W1
|-style="background:#fbb;"
| 4 || April 9 || Yankees || || 6–11 || Wickman (1–0) || Pall (0–1) || – || 2–2 || L1
|-style="background:#fbb;"
| 5 || April 10 || Yankees || || 0–12 || Key (2–0) || Bolton (0–1) || – || 2–3 || L2
|-style="background:#bfb;"
| 6 || April 11 || Yankees || || 6–4 || McDowell (2–0) || Monteleone (0–1) || Hernández (1) || 3–3 || W2
|-style="background:#fbb;"
| 7 || April 12 || Twins || || 2–3 || Deshaies (2–0) || McCaskill (0–2) || Aguilera (4) || 3–4 || L1
|-style="background:#bfb;"
| 8 || April 13 || Twins || || 4–0 || Fernandez (2–0) || Mahomes (0–2) || – || 4–4 || W1
|-style="background:#bbb;"
|—|| April 14 || Twins || colspan=7 | Postponed (rain); Makeup: August 27
|-style="background:#fbb;"
| 9 || April 16 || @ Red Sox
|-style="background:#bfb;"
| 10 || April 17 || @ Red Sox
|-style="background:#bfb;"
| 11 || April 18 || @ Red Sox
|-style="background:#bfb;"
| 12 || April 19 || @ Red Sox

|-
|-style="background:#fbb;"
| 45 || May 28 || @ Yankees || || 0–4 || Key (5–2) || McCaskill (2–5) || – || 24–21 || L4
|-style="background:#fbb;"
| 46 || May 29 || @ Yankees || || 2–8 || Abbott (4–5) || Álvarez (5–1) || – || 24–22 || L5
|-style="background:#fbb;"
| 47 || May 30 || @ Yankees || || 3–6 || Wickman (6–0) || McDowell (7–4) || Farr (11) || 24–23 || L6

|-
|-style="background:#fbb;"
| 51 || June 4 || Red Sox
|-style="background:#bfb;"
| 52 || June 5 || Red Sox
|-style="background:#bfb;"
| 53 || June 6 || Red Sox

|-

|-
|-style="background:#bfb;"
| 118 || August 17 || @ Red Sox
|-style="background:#fbb;"
| 119 || August 18 || @ Red Sox
|-style="background:#bfb;"
| 120 || August 20 || @ Twins || || 4–2 || Fernandez (15–6) || Erickson (7–15) || Hernández (27) || 66–54 || W1
|-style="background:#bfb;"
| 121 || August 21 || @ Twins || || 9–4 || Belcher (2–2) || Banks (8–8) || Hernández (28) || 67–54 || W2
|-style="background:#bfb;"
| 122 || August 22 || @ Twins || || 1–0 || McDowell (20–7) || Deshaies (11–12) || – || 68–54 || W3
|-style="background:#fbb;"
| 123 || August 23 || Yankees || || 5–6  || Assenmacher (2–0) || Radinsky (6–1) || Farr (25) || 68–55 || L1
|-style="background:#bfb;"
| 124 || August 24 || Yankees || || 4–2 || Álvarez (9–8) || Abbott (9–11) || Hernández (29) || 69–55 || W1
|-style="background:#fbb;"
| 125 || August 25 || Yankees || || 5–7 || Monteleone (6–4) || Radinsky (6–2) || Wickman (3) || 69–56 || L1
|-style="background:#bfb;"
| 126 || August 27 || Twins || || 7–3 || Belcher (3–2) || Deshaies (11–13) || – || 70–56 || W1
|-style="background:#fbb;"
| 127 || August 27 || Twins || || 2–7  || Casian (5–1) || Pall (2–3) || – || 70–57 || L1
|-style="background:#bfb;"
| 128 || August 28 || Twins || || 4–1 || Bere (6–5) || Tapani (7–13) || – || 71–57 || W1
|-style="background:#bfb;"
| 129 || August 29 || Twins || || 13–5 || McCaskill (4–7) || Guardado (3–7) || – || 72–57 || W2
|-style="background:#bfb;"
| 130 || August 30 || Twins || || 4–1 || Fernandez (16–6) || Erickson (8–16) || Hernández (30) || 73–57 || W3
|-style="background:#bfb;"
| 131 || August 31 || @ Yankees || || 11–3 || Álvarez (10–8) || Hitchcock (1–1) || – || 74–57 || W4

|-
|-style="background:#bfb;"
| 132 || September 1 || @ Yankees || || 5–3 || McDowell (21–7) || Assenmacher (2–1) || Hernández (31) || 75–57 || W5
|-style="background:#fbb;"
| 133 || September 2 || @ Yankees || || 1–7 || Key (16–5) || Belcher (3–3) || – || 75–58 || L1
|-style="background:#fbb;"
| 137 || September 6 || Red Sox
|-style="background:#fbb;"
| 138 || September 7 || Red Sox
|-style="background:#bfb;"
| 139 || September 8 || Red Sox

|-

|- style="text-align:center;"
| Legend:       = Win       = Loss       = PostponementBold = White Sox team member

Player stats

Batting 
Note: G = Games played; AB = At bats; R = Runs scored; H = Hits; 2B = Doubles; 3B = Triples; HR = Home runs; RBI = Runs batted in; BB = Base on balls; SO = Strikeouts; AVG = Batting average; SB = Stolen bases

Pitching 
Note: W = Wins; L = Losses; ERA = Earned run average; G = Games pitched; GS = Games started; SV = Saves; IP = Innings pitched; H = Hits allowed; R = Runs allowed; ER = Earned runs allowed; HR = Home runs allowed; BB = Walks allowed; K = Strikeouts

Postseason

Game log 

|-style="background:#fbb;"
| 1 || October 5 || Blue Jays || 3–7 || Guzmán (1–0) || McDowell (0–1) || – || 7:12pm || 0–1 || L1
|-style="background:#fbb;"
| 2 || October 6 || Blue Jays || 1–3 || Stewart (1–0) || Fernandez (0–1) || Ward (1) || 2:07pm || 0–2 || L2
|-style="background:#cfc;"
| 3 || October 8 || @ Blue Jays || 6–1 || Álvarez (1–0) || Hentgen (0–1) || – || 7:12pm || 1–2 || W1
|-style="background:#cfc;"
| 4 || October 9 || @ Blue Jays || 7–4 || Belcher (1–0) || Stottlemyre (0–1) || Hernández (1)|| 7:12pm || 2–2 || W2
|-style="background:#fbb;"
| 5 || October 10 || @ Blue Jays || 3–5 || Guzmán (2–0) || McDowell (0–2) || – || 3:10pm || 2–3 || L1
|-style="background:#fbb;"
| 6 || October 12 || Blue Jays || 3–6 || Stewart (2–0) || Fernandez (0–2) || Ward (2) || 7:12pm || 2–4 || L2
|-

ALCS

Awards and honors 
 Bo Jackson, 1993 AL Comeback Player of the Year
 Bo Jackson, 1993 Tony Conigliaro Award
 Jack McDowell, All-Star Game, reserve
 Jack McDowell, Cy Young Award, American League
 Frank Thomas, All-Star Game, reserve
 Frank Thomas, Silver Slugger Award
 Frank Thomas, MVP, American League
 Gene Lamont, Manager of the Year, American League

Farm system 

LEAGUE CHAMPIONS: Birmingham, South Bend

References

External links 
 1993 Chicago White Sox at Baseball Reference
 1993 White Sox: The Big Hurt, the strike and the white flag

Chicago White Sox seasons
Chicago White Sox season
American League West champion seasons
1993 in sports in Illinois